Tomislav Štrkalj (born 8 February 1996) is a Croatian professional footballer who plays as a striker for Portuguese club C.D. Tondela.

Club career
Štrkalj spent most of is youth career in several wider Zagreb area clubs, including NK Inter Zaprešić - where he became a Croatia U17 national team player and GNK Dinamo Zagreb where he moved subsequently. He joined NK Osijek's academy, however, in the summer of 2013. In 2014, he was sent on loan to the fourth-tier NK Metalac Osijek where he scored 24 goals in 28 matches. Returning to NK Osijek in the summer of 2015, he signed a five-year professional contract with the club and joined the senior team. Štrkalj made his Prva HNL debut in the 9 August 2015 3–0 away loss against NK Slaven Belupo, coming in from the bench in the 81st minute for Antonio Perošević.

On 14 August 2019 he signed a 4-year contract with Portuguese Primeira Liga club Tondela.

References

External links
 
 

1996 births
Living people
Footballers from Zagreb
Association football defenders
Croatian footballers
Croatia youth international footballers
NK Osijek players
NK Metalac Osijek players
NK Sesvete players
HNK Cibalia players
Santarcangelo Calcio players
NK Rudeš players
C.D. Tondela players
NK Hrvatski Dragovoljac players
FK Auda players
Croatian Football League players
First Football League (Croatia) players
Serie C players
Primeira Liga players
Latvian Higher League players
Croatian expatriate footballers
Expatriate footballers in Italy
Croatian expatriate sportspeople in Italy
Expatriate footballers in Portugal
Croatian expatriate sportspeople in Portugal
Expatriate footballers in Latvia
Croatian expatriate sportspeople in Latvia